Aleksander Leon Kostka-Napierski (1620–1651), Polish captain during the Thirty Years' War in Swedish service, participant of battle in Germany and organizer of the Kostka-Napierski Uprising. According to the historian prof. Paweł Wieczorkiewicz, Napierski was in service to Khmelnytsky. Professor of History Janusz Tazbir was of a similar opinion. However, other historians, such as Adam Kersten, cautiously connect Kostka-Napierski with the Swedish king, with Khmelnytsky, or with the court of Rákóczi.

Life and service
Kostka-Napierski served in the Swedish army as a mercenary during the Thirty Years' War. He returned to Poland after the death of Władysław IV Vasa. He contacted Bohdan Khmelnytsky, attempting to expand the his revolt onto Tatra Polish lands and became the leader of the Tatra highlands peasants (Górale),

In 1651, he organized recruitment to the rebel army in the Tatra mountains in Podhale (with M. Radocki and S. Łętowski). Napierski called on every peasant in Poland to rise and overthrow the nobles from their position and power. His appeal did not meet with a great response.

In June 1651, they attacked and occupied the castle in Czorsztyn, without waiting for assistance from prince George II Rákóczi (who had allied himself with  Khmelnytsky). After a short occupation, troops of the Bishop of Kraków Piotr Gembicki retook the castle. The revolt was stamped out, and Napierski and other leaders of the revolt were convicted and sentenced to capital punishment, and were impaled.

Culture
Aleksander Kostka-Napierski was featured in the Polish poet Władysław Orkan's novel Kostka-Napierski. Powieść z XVII wieku and in director's Jan Batory's movie Podhale w ogniu. Streets are named after him in Szczecin, Łódź, Katowice, and Gdynia.

See also
Kostka-Napierski Uprising

References

People executed for treason against Poland
Polish rebels
1620 births
1651 deaths
17th-century Polish nobility
17th-century Swedish military personnel
Military personnel of the Polish–Lithuanian Commonwealth
People executed by the Polish–Lithuanian Commonwealth
People executed by impalement
17th-century executions by Poland
Executed Polish people
17th-century Polish military personnel